is a video game for the Wii home game console. It was announced at a Nintendo event in Japan leading up to the Wii launch. It is set in the Stone Age and was released in Japan on July 3, 2008.

References

External links
 
Jawa: Mammoth to Himitsu no Ishi at Nintendo 

2008 video games
Action-adventure games
Japan-exclusive video games
Prehistoric people in popular culture
Video games developed in Japan
Video games set in prehistory
Wii-only games
Wii games

Spike (company) games